Shirley is an unincorporated community and census-designated place (CDP) in southwestern McLean County, Illinois, United States, just off Interstate 55. It was founded in 1854. As of the 2020 census, the population of the CDP was 135. Shirley is home to the Funk Prairie Home & Rock Museum.

History
The town of Shirley was laid out on September 14, 1866, by John M. Foster (1806 – 1898). Foster was a native of New Hampshire. Before the village was established there was a switch at the location and a few lots had been platted. Foster built a brick house and store south of the railroad. The original town consisted of ten small blocks, mostly on the north side of the St. Louis Chicago and Alton Railroad. In 1874, Foster's home and a store and the station were on the south side of the tracks, and a warehouse and mill were on the north side. In 1895 there was a Methodist church, a Christian church, and a hotel north of the tracks; at that time were about twenty houses scattered on both sides of the railroad.

References

External links
Shirley, United States Page
61772 Zip Code Detailed Profile
Funk Prairie Home & Rock Museum
Shirley 'cut' split little town in two back in 1909 - Pantagraph (Bloomington, Illinois newspaper)

Populated places established in 1866
Unincorporated communities in McLean County, Illinois
Unincorporated communities in Illinois
Census-designated places in McLean County, Illinois
Census-designated places in Illinois
1866 establishments in Illinois